Jean-Louis Lima (born 26 August 1967) is a retired French football striker.

References

External links
 

1967 births
Living people
French footballers
Racing Club de France Football players
FC Nantes players
Stade Lavallois players
Louhans-Cuiseaux FC players
Association football forwards
Ligue 1 players
Ligue 2 players